Centradenia inaequilateralis is a species of flowering plant in the family Melastomataceae, native to southern Mexico, and Central America. With its pink-purple flowers, its cultivar 'Cascade' has gained the Royal Horticultural Society's Award of Garden Merit.

References

Melastomataceae

Flora of Southeastern Mexico
Flora of Southwestern Mexico
Flora of Veracruz
Flora of Central America
Plants described in 1832